New Feelin' is Liza Minnelli's sixth album, released in the United States on October 19, 1970. It was her third and last studio album with A&M Records; Minnelli's fourth and final release on the label is her live album Live at the Olympia in Paris, released two years later in 1972. New Feelin sees Minnelli following a new formula of mixing old songs with contemporary production.

Album information
Recording took place in late spring and early summer 1970 at Fame Recording Studios in Muscle Shoals, Alabama. The title reflected the state of mind the label and Minnelli felt they should have when producing this collection. Seeing as the formula employed for the previous two albums didn't work, they drastically reworked it: they decided to choose a selection of covers of old songs from as early as 1917 through to the 1940s, with the only new factor being the production, which was very pop-country-soul.

It was new territory for everyone concerned: Minnelli had never done anything like this before (but committed to the project completely). And the producer, Rex Kramer, who was dating the singer at the time and was also the front man of the musical group Bojangles, had never produced an album before. This album, unlike the previous two for A&M recorded by Minnelli, charted, debuting on November 28, 1970 peaking at 158. It is likely the reasons for this positive change are that she appeared on several television shows to promote it (This Is Tom Jones, The Ed Sullivan Show, The Johnny Cash Show) and even performed at the Grand Ole Opry in Nashville. A fourth album to follow the relative success of New Feelin''' was planned to be recorded in early 1971 but was scrapped as the singer was getting ready to give the performance that would put her on the map forever, the role of Sally Bowles in the movie adaptation of the musical Cabaret.

Track listing
 "Love for Sale" (Cole Porter)
 "Stormy Weather" (Harold Arlen, Ted Koehler)
 "Come Rain or Come Shine" (Harold Arlen, Johnny Mercer)
 "Lazy Bones" (Johnny Mercer, Hoagy Carmichael)
 "Can't Help Lovin' That Man of Mine" (Oscar Hammerstein, Jerome Kern)
 "I Wonder Where My Easy Rider's Gone" (Shelton Brooks)
 "The Man I Love" (George Gershwin, Ira Gershwin)
 "How Long Has This Been Going On?" (George Gershwin, Ira Gershwin)
 "God Bless the Child" (Billie Holiday, Arthur Herzog)
 "Maybe This Time" (Fred Ebb, John Kander)

Re-release
The album was released on Compact Disc in its entirety for the first time as part of Liza Minnelli: The Complete A&M Recordings, a 2-CD set released by Collector's Choice Music in 2008. This included outtakes and previously unreleased recordings from the A&M recording sessions.

Personnel
 Produced and arranged by Rex Kramer
 Original album engineers: Mickey Buckins, Sonny Limbo
 Art director: Tom Wilkes
 Photography: Rex Kramer

Charts

References

Other sources
 Liza Minnelli: When It Comes Down to It.......1968–1977 liner notes by Glenn A. Baker, 2003
 Liza Minnelli: The Complete A&M Recordings liner notes by Scott Schechter, 2008
 Liza Minnelli: The Complete Capitol Collection'' liner notes by Scott Schechter, 2006

Liza Minnelli albums
1970 albums
A&M Records albums